Sam Richardson (born January 12, 1984) is an American actor, comedian, writer, and producer. He is best known for playing Richard Splett in the HBO political comedy series Veep (2012–2019), co-creating and co-starring in the Comedy Central comedy series Detroiters (2017–2018) alongside Tim Robinson, playing various characters in the Netflix sketch show I Think You Should Leave with Tim Robinson (2019–present), and co-starring in the Apple TV+ series The Afterparty (2022). In 2022, he was nominated for the Primetime Emmy Award for Outstanding Guest Actor in a Comedy Series for his performance as Edwin Akufo in Ted Lasso.

Early life
Richardson was born in Detroit on January 12, 1984, the son of a Ghanaian mother and an African-American father. His aunt was Barbara-Rose Collins (née Richardson), who in 1990 became the first black woman from Michigan to be elected to the United States Congress. 
Once or twice a year, Richardson would travel with his parents to Ghana, where his grandfather was a chief and local political leader. He graduated from the University of Detroit Jesuit High School and Academy in 2002, and studied theater at Wayne State University.

Career
Early in his career, Richardson performed at the Second City in Detroit and then in Chicago. At Second City, he was known for a wide range of characters, from sight gags to impressions of public figures.

Following a move to Los Angeles, Richardson appeared in six episodes (including the series finale) of The Office and a season 4 episode of Arrested Development. He has also appeared on episodes of Drunk History, New Girl, Teachers, and six episodes of Harder Than It Looks. He played Richard Splett on the HBO political comedy series Veep, first appearing in four episodes during season 3 as the handler for Selina Meyer during her Iowa book tour. During season 4, Richardson was made a regular cast member of the show, after his character received a job offer in President Meyer's administration as an assistant to the character Jonah. He has also appeared in films including We're the Millers, Horrible Bosses 2, Spy, Neighbors 2: Sorority Rising, Mike and Dave Need Wedding Dates, and Ghostbusters.

In 2015, Comedy Central ordered a pilot for the series Detroiters, created by Richardson and Tim Robinson. The show stars Richardson and Robinson, who also co-wrote and co-executive produced the series with others. Comedy Central then ordered ten episodes of the series, which began shooting in the Detroit area in 2016. According to Detroit Free Press, "In the series, Richardson and Robinson play struggling advertising men in Detroit who make local TV commercials. The plot was inspired partly by the classic Detroit ads they grew up watching, including the Mel Farr Superstar and Gordy from ABC Warehouse campaigns." Detroiters ran for two seasons before its cancellation by Comedy Central in 2018.

In 2016, Richardson was nominated for the Best Performance in a Variety or Sketch Comedy Program or Series (Individual or Ensemble) award at the Canadian Screen Awards for his work on The Second City Project. He was also nominated for the Outstanding Performance by an Ensemble in a Comedy Series at the 2015, 2016, 2017, and 2018 Screen Actors Guild Awards for his work on Veep, winning the last one. In 2018, he began playing Alf in the YouTube Premium series Champaign ILL. Since 2019, he has played various characters in the Netflix sketch show I Think You Should Leave with Tim Robinson.

In 2022, Richardson was in the main cast of the Apple TV+ mystery comedy series The Afterparty.

Filmography

Film

Television

Awards and nominations

References

External links 
 

Living people
1984 births
21st-century American male actors
African-American male actors
African-American male comedians
American male comedians
American male film actors
American male stage actors
American male television actors
American male voice actors
American people of Ghanaian descent
Male actors from Detroit
21st-century American comedians
21st-century African-American people
20th-century African-American people